Uncial 0269 (in the Gregory-Aland numbering), ε 83 (Soden), is a Greek uncial manuscript of the New Testament. Paleographically it has been assigned to the 9th century.

Description 

The codex contains a small part of the Gospel of Mark 6:14-20, on one parchment leaf (33 cm by 25 cm). The text is written in two columns per page, 25 lines per page, in uncial letters. It is a palimpsest,
the upper text contains menaion.

Currently it is dated by the INTF to the 9th century.

Location 

Currently the codex is housed at the British Library (Add. 31919, f. 23) in London.

Text 

The Greek text of this codex is mixed with predominate the Byzantine element. Aland placed it in Category III.

See also 

 List of New Testament uncials
 Textual criticism
 Uncial 0133

References

Further reading 

 J. Harold Greenlee, Codex 0269: A Palimpsest Fragment of Mark, in: James Keith Elliott, "Studies in New Testament Language and Text", Novum Testamentum Supplements XLIV (Leiden, 1976), pp. 235-238. 

Greek New Testament uncials
Palimpsests
9th-century biblical manuscripts